Vexillum articulatum, common name the articulated mitre, is a species of small sea snail, marine gastropod mollusk in the family Costellariidae, the ribbed miters.

Description
The length of the shell attains 11.4 mm.

(Original description) The shell is shortly fusiform and somewhat ventricose. The whorls are smooth, longitudinally rather obsoletely plicated, slightly tubercled in the middle. The shell is pale pinkish scarlet, encircled with a small white brown-articulated zone. The columella is four-plaited. 

The shell is pale pinkish scarlet, encircled with a small white brown articulated zone.

Distribution
This species occurs in the Gulf of Mexico off Louisiana.

References

  Sarasúa H. (1978). Especies nuevas de Mitridae (Mollusca: Neogastropoda). Poeyana. 180 1-9.
 Sarasúa, H. (1985). Nuevo nombre para Pusia callipicta Sarasúa (Mollusca: Neogastropoda) y lista actualizida de las especies cubanas de la subfamilia Vexillinae. Miscelanea Zoologica. 27: 1-2. 
 Turner H. 2001. Katalog der Familie Costellariidae Macdonald, 1860. Conchbooks. 1–100 page(s): 18

External links
  E.F. Garcia- On Vexillum (Pusia) articulatum (Reeve, 1845) and V. (P.) trophonium (Dall, 1889); American conchologist : quarterly bulletin of the Conchologists of America, v. 39 (2011)

articulatum
Gastropods described in 1845